Spectrum Dome is a lava dome in the Spectrum Range of northwestern British Columbia, Canada. It last erupted during the Pliocene epoch.

See also
List of volcanoes in Canada
List of Northern Cordilleran volcanoes
Volcanism of Canada
Volcanism of Western Canada

References

Mount Edziza volcanic complex
Pliocene lava domes